Maria Belobrovina (born 3 March 1999) is a Belarusian footballer who plays as a midfielder and has appeared for the Belarus women's national team.

Career
Belobrovina has been capped for the Belarus national team, appearing for the team during the 2019 FIFA Women's World Cup qualifying cycle.

References

External links
 
 
 

1999 births
Living people
Belarusian women's footballers
Belarus women's international footballers
Women's association football midfielders